Brachyglottis elaeagnifolia is a species of flowering plant in the family Asteraceae. It is endemic to New Zealand, where it is limited to the North Island.

Description 
Brachyglottis elaeagnifolia  is a shrub which grows to a height of 3 metres. The branches are grooved and the smaller branches and petioles are coated in whitish or pale brownish hairs. The leathery leaves are widely lance-shaped to oblong and up to 9 centimetres long. The upper surfaces are shiny and hairless and the undersides have silvery whitish or brownish hairs. The inflorescence is a panicle of woolly flower heads containing disc florets. The fruit is an achene 1 to 2 millimetres long with a pappus of barbed white hairs up to 5 millimetres long.

Distribution and habitat 
Volcanic debris on Mount Taranaki has been colonized by this species, which occurs in dense stands up to 100 years old.

References 

elaeagnifolia
Endemic flora of New Zealand